Monstre Marin Corporation (Sea Monster Corporation) known as MMC was a French record label, located in Paris. It is founded by rapper and singer Gims, and affiliated with the Universal Music France record company. The first compilation of the label La Monster Party chapitre 1 was published on 30 June 2014. At the same time, Gims opened a management firm called Warano Consulting.

History 
In 2013, Gims founded Monstre Marin Corporation with Pascal Nègre. The latter announces the direct integration of MMC into Universal. "Maître Gims is one of the most gifted artists of his generation! I am delighted to accompany him with Universal Music in his discovery of new talents and in the development of his label Sea Monster, "he explains on his Twitter page. The label's logo was unveiled in early 2014.

In February 2014, L'Algérino joined the label, followed in June 2014 by Mac Tyer. Monstre Marin Corporation published its first compilation La Monster Party chapitre 1 on 30 June 2014. According to BFM TV, Gims sold 50% of the label Monstre Marin Corporation in 2014 for 500,000 euros. This structure sold to Universal Music France brought together many artists such as Vitaa, Souf, Mac Tyer, L'Algérino, MA2X, Lartiste or even the Marin Monster duo, now all gone and replaced by emerging artists like DJ Arafat, DJ Last One, Amalya or Savana blues.

The label ends its activities on 13 January 2020.

Artists

Former artists 

 Amalya
 L'Algérino
 Vitaa
 Lartiste
 Ma2x

 Mac Tyer
 X-Gangs
 L'Insolent
 Saty Djelass
 Souf

 Cinco
 DJ Arafat
 Savana blues
 Louka
 DJ Last One

 Syam
 Kaaris

Former groupes 

 Marin Monster
 Dr Yaro & Lafolie

Producers 

 Yalatif Beatz (composer)
 Double X (composer

Discography

Studio albums 

 2014: Aigle Royal (L'Algérino)
 2014: Marin Monster (Marin Monster)
 2015: Je suis une légende (Mac Tyer)
 2015: La Même (Vitaa)
 2016: Toujours le même (Ma2x)
 2016: Maestro (Lartiste)
 2016: Alchimie (Souf)
 2017: Yorogang (DJ Arafat)

Compilation albums 

 2014: La Monster Party chapitre 1

Extended plays 

 2016: Amalya EP (Amalya)

External links 
Monstre Marin Corporation on Discogs

References 

Gims
Universal Music Group
Hip hop record labels